Lespinasse or de Lespinasse may refer to:

 Lespinasse (restaurant), a former restaurant in Manhattan, New York
 Lespinasse, Haute-Garonne, France

People
 Augustin de Lespinasse (1737–1816), French military leader
 Ernest Lespinasse (1897–1927), French Olympic gymnast
 Gabrielle Lespinasse (1888–c. 1970), French muse for the Spanish artist Pablo Picasso
 Jeanne Julie Éléonore de Lespinasse (1732–1776), French salon holder
 René de Lespinasse (1843–1922), French historian and politician

See also
 Lespinassière, Aude, France
 Saint-Forgeux-Lespinasse, Loire, France
 Saint-Germain-Lespinasse, Loire, France
 Saint-Jean-Lespinasse, Lot, France
 Saint-Vincent-Lespinasse, Tarn-et-Garonne, France
 Espinasse (disambiguation)